Mahabharata (also known as Amar Chitra Katha's Mahabharata) is a comic adaptation of the Indian epic poem Mahabharata. The 42-issue best-selling series by Amar Chitra Katha, Mumbai was illustrated by Dilip Kadam. The team of script writers (who took turns to complete the 42 issues) included Kamala Chandrakant, TMP Nedungadi, Subba Rao, Yagya Sharma, Lopamudra, Mihir Lal Mitra, Sumona Roy, Mohan Swaminathan, Shubha Kandhekar and Margie Sastry.

The Mahabharata is often regarded as one of the most popular titles in the history of Amar Chitra Katha. It is also the longest series (42 issue run on an alternative title schedule; from 329-441 [1985-89] in over more than 1300 pages) to have been produced by the ACK. The series was originally planned for 60 albums, but it was later cut short to 42.

Concept and creation 
Amar Chitra Katha had a strong commitment to the Mahabharata from the very beginning. Many of its titles were from based on particular events or characters from the Mahabharata. In March 1985, the new project began, "in response to a persistent demand from our readers for a comprehensive account of the epic." The ambitious series by Anant Pai was initially decided as a 60 volume project, with one issue in every fortnight. However, in 1988, Amar Chitra Katha issued only one issue a month, so that Mahabharata numbers came out only in every two months.

The Mahabharata comics was based on,

 A Sanskrit text with Hindi translation by Pundit Ramnarayan Dutt Shastri Pandey (Gita Press, Gorakhpur)
 A Malayalam verse version by Kunjikkuttan Tampuram (SPCS, Kottayam)
 Pratap Chandra Roy's English prose version (Munshiram Manoharlal Publishers, New Delhi)
 Pune critical edition (Bhandarkar Oriental Research Institute, Pune)

Structure 
The comics does not include the Harivamsha (a supplement to the Mahabharata) and the abbreviated version of the Ramayana. It also omits the character Ugrasrava Sauti and the first issue ("Veda Vyasa") begins with sage Vyasa acquiring the elephant god Ganesha as his scribe and starting the dictation. It soon moves on to Vaisampayana narrating the epic to Janamejaya. This latter pair persist till the last panel of the series, appearing from time to time in panels colored differently. In addition, the events of the Battle of Kurukshetra was narrated to Dhritarashtra by his advisor Sanjaya, who both appeared in the middle of the battle sequences in different colored panels, thus making it a narration within a narration. 

The comics also included various footnotes explaining the meaning Sanskrit terms, and the few issues also consisted a pronunciation guide and glossary. Issues usually start with a page containing a summary of the last few issues, and in the backdrop illustrations of the Gita setting, with Arjuna kneeling before Krishna in the battlefield.

Individual titles 
Several individual books were released. They're
Shakuntala
Savitri
Nala Damayanti
Urvashi
Nahusha
Yayati
Kacha and Devayani
Indra and Shachi
Golden Mongoose
Tales of Arjuna
Bheema and Hanuman
Abhimanyu
Pareekshit
Uloopi
Tales of Yudhistira
Pandavas in the hiding
The Pandava princes
Amba
Bheeshma
Jayadratha
Drona
Ghatotkach
Karna
Draupadi
Gandhari
Chandrahasa
Tapati
Aruni and Uttanka
Sukanya
Indra and Shibi
Jayadratha

Chapters about Krishna and yadavas
Krishna the protector of Dharma
Bhagavata Purana
Krishna and Rukmini
Krishna and Jarasandha
Krishna and Shishupala
Krishna and false Vasudeva
The Shyamantaka Gem
Krishna and Narakasura
Parijata Tree
Pradyumna
Aniruddha
Prabhavati
Bhanumati
Subhadra
Tales of Balaram
The Gita
Sudama

Influences and conflicts 
Amar Chitra Katha series on Mahabarata (1985–89) coincided with Baldev Raj Chopra's famous television drama series Mahabharat (1988–90). Although, some fans took great pleasure in encountering Mahabharata in both mediums, the television series spelled big trouble for the comic book series. Amar Chitra Katha and the state-run Doordarshan television channel (DD National) competed for the same urban middle class audience.

It is widely accepted that visual and narrative "homogenization" occurs between the ACK'S Mahabharata and Baldev Raj Chopra's Mahabharat. Television producers have repeatedly turned to the Amar Chitra Katha series as reference material for costume design, set production, and subject matter.

The advertisements of the comic series contained the exhortation "Read it to enjoy your Sunday viewing [of the BR Chopra's Mahabharat]!". It seems possible that the comic series was hastened to 42 issues from 60 to take advantage of the television series.

Collected formats 
 The late 1980s saw the first of the collected format of the Mahabharata with a 7 volume "Library Edition".
 A 14 volume special edition was published in the late 1990s.
 A hard-bounded 3 volume edition in 1998 (reprinted in late 2007, 2012)

References

External links 

 Mahabharata- Amar Chitra Katha
 Mahabharata Complete Collection 42 Title Comics Set in Apple iBooks
 Mahabharata Complete Collection 42 Title Comics Set inApp in Apple IndiaComics iPad App
 Dilip Kadam website

state=collapsed
Mythology in comics
War comics
Indian comics
Comics based on poems
1985 comics debuts
1989 comics endings